Nemophora stellata is a moth of the Adelidae family or fairy longhorn moths. It was described by Toshiya Hirowatari in 1995. It is found on the Japanese islands of Shikoku and Kyushu.

The wingspan is 9–12 mm. The base of the forewing is golden yellow.

References

Adelidae
Moths described in 1995
Moths of Japan